Brian Thomas Higgins (born 1966) is an English record producer, who has written and produced albums and tracks for several successful pop music singers and groups, including Girls Aloud, S Club 7, Sugababes, and The Saturdays through his Xenomania production team. Miranda Cooper is a key collaborator who shares co-writing credits in nearly all Xenomania-written tracks. 

His musical style has been described as part electro, part power pop, more basic pop with elements of new wave, rave, and dance found in many of his collaborations in the more than 15 years he has been in the music industry.

Early career
Higgins hails from Whitehaven, Cumbria on the edge of the Lake District of England. The second eldest of 5 children, his father was a general practitioner. Influenced by the band ®tm (Registered Trade Mark) in the early eighties, he then played keyboards in a band called Despatch, which included former members of ®tm.

In the late 1980s, he moved to East Grinstead, West Sussex. Along with fellow Cumbrian and guitarist Dave Colquhoun they formed a band named Anything You Want, which also featured Mark Scott. Dave Colquhoun soon left the band and now plays guitar with Rick Wakeman of Yes fame. Scott and Higgins continued and had one release with Profile Records. They wrote countless songs for some eight years including the original Believe song that was a hit for Cher. Scott introduced Higgins to Steve Rodway (also known as Motiv8) who took on Higgins as a session musician. Higgins then co-wrote and co-produced the successful 1997 song, "All I Wanna Do" for Dannii Minogue. Two of his collaborators on the single, Tim Powell and Matt Gray, became important future members of Xenomania.

Higgins' involvement in "All I Wanna Do" led to an opportunity to co-write a song for Cher. It led to the international number one hit, "Believe", which was released in 1998. Again Powell and Gray were among his collaborators.

He said that his sometimes wide musical tastes growing up, from punk rock groups like the Buzzcocks and the Sex Pistols, to more electronic-based groups like Depeche Mode and New Order, have informed his musical style as the main producer behind Xenomania. He added, "It's natural for me to look for combinations of both in the music Xenomania creates".

Xenomania
In 2000, Higgins and Gray produced a single for London Records with the singer, Miranda Cooper (a.k.a. Moonbaby). Although the song did not become a hit, Cooper's lyric writing talent would become a key part of Xenomania.

Complications resulted from the late nineties sale of London Records to Universal Music Group. Eventually, Xenomania became an independent production company based in Kent where Higgins, Cooper, and the rest of the Xenomania production team currently reside.

"He thinks everyone's got at least one number one hit in them", says Cooper, his long-time writing partner, in a 2004 Observer Music Monthly article. Higgins clarified, "Music is a fundamental human need. Well, maybe not as necessary as water, but there's a natural tendency towards melody and rhythm in everybody. It's just a question of bringing it out."

In 2016, Higgins founded Twin Xenomania Ltd. with Nick Gatfield. Music released under the label included songs by Liv Lovelle.

Collaborations
Artists that Higgins has produced and/or written with/for include Pet Shop Boys, Sugababes, Dannii Minogue, The Saturdays, Girls Aloud, Sophie Ellis-Bextor, Kylie Minogue, Bananarama, Alesha Dixon, Texas, Rachel Stevens, Gabriella Cilmi, Mollie King, Nadine Coyle, Kaiser Chiefs, and Saint Etienne among others. 

Higgins said of Sugababes member Mutya Buena, "She's undoubtedly the finest female singer this country has produced in years–for me the closest comparison is Dusty Springfield."

References

Sources

External links
  Full Discography of Xenomania (Fansite)

1966 births
Living people
English record producers
English songwriters
Xenomania